Raes Junction is a small settlement in New Zealand, located at the intersection of State Highways 8 and 90, in the lower South Island. The highways which meet at the junction are the main routes to the Clutha valley for travellers from Dunedin and Invercargill respectively.

Raes Junction is 62 kilometres by road from Milton, 67 km from Gore, and 72 km from Alexandra. The junction lies three kilometres to the south of the Clutha River. The nearest town of any significant size is Lawrence, which is 25 kilometres to the southeast.

Although the settlement itself is little more than a farming and horticultural community, its location at this mid-way junction is thus of considerable regional importance, as is the larger settlement of Beaumont, some six kilometres to the southeast.

Populated places in Otago